Hammadi Ahmed Abdullah Al-Daiya (born 18 October 1989 in Samarra) is an Iraqi professional footballer who plays as a striker for Al-Quwa Al-Jawiya and the Iraq national team.

Club career
The player started his career with two local clubs in the lower divisions, first at hometown side Al-Ishaqi and then Balad. In 2004, he moved to first division club Salahaddin where he spent only a season before making his name at Samarra becoming the club’s main striker and match-winner and is fondly remembered by their fans.

His move to Baghdad giants Al-Quwa Al-Jawiya came about after he was one of the provincial players called into the national team after the appointment of German Wolfgang Sidka in 2010 and roomed with Al-Jawiya’s Ahmed Ayad – who was the go-between with the player and the Al-Jawiya club officials and after he was given his release papers by Samarra, he signed for the famous club.

He helped Iraq to the World Military Cup in the 2013 CISM World Military Cup where Hamadi was the tournament’s top scorer with nine goals in Baku. Hamadi is a poacher in the six-yard box and has been one of the most prolific goal scorers in the Iraqi league scoring almost 100 goals in his six seasons with the Blue Falcons in the league including 27 goals in a single season in his second season at the club where he was league top scorer for the first time in his career.

On 1 December 2016 Hammadi received offers from clubs in Qatar, Baniyas club in United Arab Emirates and Al-Shabab FC in Saudi Arabia to play to their team.

International career

Ahmed made his senior international debut for Iraq on 17 April 2012 against Egypt, and on 14 November 2012, he scored his first goal for the national team against Jordan.

International goals

Style of play 
Brazil football legend Zico commenting on Ahmed. is a player very well for me. It was very fast and good technically.

Honours

Al-Quwa Al-Jawiya
 Iraqi Premier League: 2016–17, 2020–21
 Iraq FA Cup: 2015–16, 2020–21
 AFC Cup: 2016, 2017, 2018

Iraq
 Arab Nations Cup third place: 2012
 WAFF Championship runner-up: 2012
 Arabian Gulf Cup runner-up: 2013

Iraq Military
 CISM World Football Trophy: 2013

Individual
 Iraqi Premier League Top scorer: 2011–12 (27 goals), 2015–16 (12 goals)
 World Men's Military Cup Top scorer: 2013 (9 goals)
 AFC Cup Top scorer: 2016 (16 goals)
 AFC Cup Most Valuable Player: 2016, 2018
 Asian Footballer of the Year runner-up: 2016

References

External links
  Scorer AFC Cup
 Matthew Ashton Photo Award
 
 
 
 
 Profile on goalzz.com

1989 births
Living people
Iraqi footballers
Iraq international footballers
Al-Quwa Al-Jawiya players
People from Samarra
Association football forwards
Footballers at the 2016 Summer Olympics
Olympic footballers of Iraq
AFC Cup winning players